CppCMS is an open-source web application framework for the C++ programming language developed by Artyom Beilis. The primary goal of CppCMS is building performance-demanding web applications. It may also be used for embedded web applications for consumer devices (such as administration consoles for routers, or smart devices).  The library is available under MIT license. It currently targets POSIX-compatible platforms as well as Microsoft Windows.

Despite what the name suggests, it is not a content management system.

Major features
 A variety of web server APIs – FastCGI, SCGI, HTTP
 Support of various concurrency models: cooperative (single thread), thread pool, prefork
 Separation of content and layout with a powerful template engine
 Inheritance of web templates
 Cache framework with trigger-based and timeout-based invalidation
 Support of Ajax and Comet programming 
 Form processing and validation
 Session state management via different backends: encrypted cookies, files, cache, database and distributed solutions.
 Internationalization and localization, including support of right-to-left languages. CppCMS contributed its localization module to the Boost project.

See also

Comparison of web frameworks
Poco
Wt

References

External links
The CppCMS Project home page (blog with updates)
 
 

Free software programmed in C++
Software using the MIT license
Web frameworks